Dixville is a municipality in Quebec, Canada, situated east of Stanstead, in the regional county municipality of Coaticook and the region of Eastern Township.

History
Dixville was originally known as "Drew's Mills", named after a settler, who the early 1800s, had built a saw mill at this location on the Coaticook River. The settlement began around the year 1830; the site was back then part of the Township of Barford. A Mr. Drew set up a dwelling on the banks of the Coaticook River, cleared land to build a sawmill beside a dam which he had built. In 1836, John Wright came to join up with Drew. Soon after, others came to this place and the village became known as Drew's Mills.

Shortly before the turn of the century, it was renamed Dixville, after Richard Dick Baldwin, who was known as "Uncle Dick" by the majority of the town's residents.

The name Saint-Mathieu-de-Dixville was used in the past. It may be the name of the local Roman Catholic church.

Demographics

Population
Population trend:

Dam
There is a dam in the municipality at 45° 04' 07"  71° 46' 15"

References

External links
 
  Official site

Incorporated places in Estrie
Municipalities in Quebec
Coaticook Regional County Municipality